The Home Army 5th Wilno Brigade (also known as the Brigade of Death) was a unit of the Polish anti-Nazi resistance organization Home Army, active in the Vilnius Region during World War II. The main commander of the brigade was major Zygmunt Szendzielarz, nom de guerre "Łupaszko".

During the German occupation of Poland the brigade found itself in particularly difficult circumstances as it faced off against three different foes; the German Nazis, Lithuanian units which were collaborating with them, as well as Soviet partisans who generally fought against Home Army units in the region. In July 1944, the brigade numbered around 500 partisans.

References

External links
 The Home Army 5th and 6th Wilno Brigades: 1944-1952
 An interview with Janina Wasiłojć-Smoleńska, nom de guerre "Jachna"

Units and formations of the Home Army
Military units and formations of Poland in World War II
1943 establishments in Poland
1952 disestablishments in Poland
Military units and formations established in 1943
Military units and formations disestablished in 1952